Herrickia horrida is a species of flowering plant in the family Asteraceae known by the common name horrid herrickia. It is native to Colorado and New Mexico in the United States, where it occurs only in the Animas River basin. It is often included in genus Eurybia.

Herrickia horrida is a clumpy perennial herb or subshrub growing 30 to 60 centimeters tall from a woody rhizome. There are one to many stems which are coated in resin glands. The leaves are oval or oblong in shape with bases that clasp the stem. They are up to 4.5 centimeters in length. They are tough, glandular, coated in rough hairs, and lined with spiny teeth on the edges. The inflorescence may be a single flower head or an array of several heads. Each head is lined with glandular green or purplish phyllaries. It contains purple ray florets which may be up to 2.2 centimeters long, and yellow or purplish disc florets. Blooming occurs in summer, or as late as October. The fruit is an achene with a pappus of bristles.

Herrickia horrida grows on dry mountain slopes and canyons, often in oak woodlands, pinyon-juniper woodlands and grasslands. Most of its habitat is rugged and inaccessible, which helps protect it from human threats.

References

Astereae
Flora of Colorado
Plants described in 1913
Flora of New Mexico